Lakes Regional Park (often called Lakes Park) is a 279-acre public park located along Gladiolus Drive (CR 865) just south of Fort Myers, Florida. It opened on April 21, 1984, and is operated by the Lee County Department of Parks and Recreation. The park was named after its main feature: 158 acres of man-made freshwater lakes. The lakes were formed by a rock mine that operated on the property in the 1960s. The park is part of the Great Florida Birding Trail as well as Lee County's Tour de Parks bicycle route along with the John Yarbrough Linear Park and other locations.

Features
A variety of wildlife can be spotted throughout Lakes Park, especially birds. The park includes about 2.5 miles of walking and biking trails running along the lakes. A scenic boardwalk carries the trails over the lakes. Other features include playgrounds, a large field for recreational activities, as well as a fragrance garden with herb, butterfly, and cactus gardens.

Train Village
One notable feature at Lakes Park is the Lakes Park & Gulf Railroad, a  gauge miniature railway, which takes riders on a 15-minute ride through the north end of the park. The railroad departs from the Railroad Museum of South Florida's Train Village in the center of the park. Besides the railway and the museum itself, the Train Village area also includes a children’s playground and a full size historic locomotive and caboose on display. The miniature railway has carried over 300,000 passengers since it opened in 1994. The Train Village pays homage to the Seaboard Air Line Railroad’s former branch to Punta Rassa, which ran through the Lakes Park property just south of the Train Village and boardwalk from the 1920s until 1952. A portion of these tracks were later used by the Atlantic Coast Line Railroad to service the rock mine that created the lakes in the park.

Gallery

References

External links
 Lakes Regional Park

7½ in gauge railways in the United States
Parks in Florida
Parks in Lee County, Florida
Tourist attractions in Fort Myers, Florida
Miniature railroads in the United States
1984 establishments in Florida